Ligustrum glomeratum is a plant in the family Oleaceae. The specific epithet glomeratum means "gathered closely", referring to the flowers.

Description
The twigs are pale brown. Its fragrant flowers are white or yellow. The fruit ripens to dark purple.

Distribution and habitat
Ligustrum glomeratum is native to Peninsular Malaysia, Singapore, the Andaman & Nicobar Islands, Sumatra, Java, the Lesser Sunda Islands, the Philippines, Christmas Island and Papua New Guinea. Its habitat is mixed dipterocarp forest to  altitude.

Etymology
Ligustrum means 'binder'. It was named by Pliny and Virgil.

References

glomeratum
Flora of the Andaman Islands
Flora of the Nicobar Islands
Flora of Malesia
Flora of Papua New Guinea
Flora of Christmas Island
Plants described in 1851